Kerem Özmen is a Turkish boxer. He competed at the 2021 AIBA World Boxing Championships, being awarded the silver medal in the light welterweight event.

References

External links 

Living people
Year of birth missing (living people)
Place of birth missing (living people)
Turkish male boxers
Light-welterweight boxers
AIBA World Boxing Championships medalists
21st-century Turkish people